The 2009 World Junior Figure Skating Championships was an international competition in the 2008–09 season. Commonly called "World Juniors" and "Junior Worlds", they are an annual figure skating competition in which elite figure skaters compete for the title of World Junior Champion in the disciplines of men's singles, ladies' singles, pair skating, and ice dancing.

The event was held between February 22 and March 1, 2009, at the Winter Sports Hall in Sofia, Bulgaria. The event had been provisionally scheduled to be held in Ostrava, Czech Republic, however, due to financial reasons, the Czech Figure Skating Association could not host. Therefore, on October 13, 2008, the International Skating Union definitively assigned the World Junior Championships to Sofia.

Qualification
The competition was open to skaters from ISU member nations who had reached the age of 13 by July 1, 2008, but had not yet turned 19. The upper age limit for men competing in pairs and dance was 21.

The term "Junior" refers to the age level rather than necessarily the skill level. Therefore, some of the skaters competing have competed nationally and internationally at the senior level, but are still age-eligible for World Juniors. Regardless of whether they have competed as seniors, all competitors perform programs that conform to the ISU rules for junior level competition in terms of program lengths, jumping passes, etc.

Number of entries per discipline
All members nations have one entry in each discipline by default. Member nations may earn more than entry based on their performance at the previous year's championships.

The following countries earned more than one entry to the 2009 World Junior Championships based on their performance at the 2008 World Junior Championships.

Schedule
All times are GMT+2.

 Tuesday, February 24
 13:30 Ice dancing – Compulsory Dance
 18:30 Opening Ceremony
 19:00 Pairs – Short Program
 Wednesday, February 25
 10:00 Men – Short Program (1st Half)
 14:00 Men – Short Program (2nd Half)
 19:00 Pairs – Free Skating
 Thursday, February 26
 13:00 Ice dancing – Original Dance
 18:30 Men – Free Skating
 Friday, February 27
 09:00 Ladies – Short Program (1st Half)
 14:00 Ladies – Short Program (2nd Half)
 18:30 Ice dancing – Free Dance
 Saturday, February 28
 13:30 Ladies – Free Skating
 Sunday, March 1
 14:00 Exhibition

Medals table

Results

Men

Ladies

Pairs

Ice dancing

References

External links

 Official site
 
 Competitors list

World Junior
World Junior Figure Skating Championships
World Junior 2009